Darren Collins (born 24 May 1967) is an English former professional footballer. He is now assistant manager of non-league club Brackley Town.

He started his career with Petersfield Town before signing for Northampton Town in January 1989. He made 40 appearances, plus another 9 as substitute, scoring 9 goals. During the 1990–91 season he moved to Aylesbury United, then Enfield before signing for Rushden & Diamonds in 1994. In 6 years at Nene Park he became the club's record goalscorer with 153 goals. He joined Kettering in November 2000 for a £25,000 fee (equalling the club's record) and skippered them to the Southern League title. He joined Cambridge City in June 2002, transferred to Tamworth in December  2002 and, after helping them to promotion to the Conference, switched to Grantham Town in August 2003. He played briefly for Nuneaton Borough, had two years at Cogenhoe United  before finishing his career at Wellingborough Town. Even in his 40th year Collins was still a prolific goalscorer, before finally retiring in May 2007.

Currently driving lorries for Travis Perkins.

References

External links

1967 births
Living people
English footballers
Petersfield Town F.C. players
Northampton Town F.C. players
Aylesbury United F.C. players
Enfield F.C. players
Rushden & Diamonds F.C. players
Kettering Town F.C. players
Cambridge City F.C. players
Tamworth F.C. players
Grantham Town F.C. players
Nuneaton Borough F.C. players
Dagenham & Redbridge F.C. players
Cogenhoe United F.C. players
Wellingborough Town F.C. players
Association football forwards
Sportspeople from Winchester
Brackley Town F.C. players
Footballers from Hampshire